Gaura is a village in Ghazipur District of Uttar Pradesh, India

See also
Suhwal

References

Villages in Ghazipur district